The Master-General of the Ordnance (MGO) is a very senior military position in the Indian Army held by a serving lieutenant general.

References

Indian military appointments
Indian Army appointments